Patrie (English: Country) is a 1946 French historical drama film directed by Louis Daquin and starring Pierre Blanchar, Maria Mauban and Jean Desailly. It was entered into the 1946 Cannes Film Festival. Like the 1917 silent film of the same title it is based on the 1869 play by Victorien Sardou. It was shot at the Epinay Studios in Paris. The film's sets were designed by the art director René Moulaert.

Plot
In Brussels in the 1560s the rebelling Flemish nobles are battling the Spanish under the Duke of Alba. The Count De Rysoor, a prominent leader, is planning an uprising aiming to hold the city until relief from William of Orange can arrive. When he discovers an affair his wife is having with a fellow officer, he at first turns a blind eye to it as he always puts his country before his private concerns. However it soon begins to put the whole conspiracy at risk.

Cast
 Pierre Blanchar as Le comte de Rysoor
 Jean Desailly as Karloo
 Maria Mauban as La comtesse de Rysoor
 Lucien Nat as Duke of Alba
 Pierre Dux as Jonas
 Julien Bertheau as William of Orange
 Louis Seigner as Vargas
 Pierre Asso as Pablo
 Marcel Lupovici as Del Rio 
 Mireille Perrey as Catherine Jonas
 Nathalie Nattier as 	La camériste
 Marie Leduc as 	Donna Rafaela
 Fernand René as 	Un échevin
 Louis Florencie as 	Un échevin 
 Jacqueline Duc as 	La mariée
 Guy Decomble as Un échevin

References

Bibliography
 Goble, Alan. The Complete Index to Literary Sources in Film. Walter de Gruyter, 1999.
 Sieglohr, Ulrike. Heroines Without Heroes: Reconstructing Female and National Identities in European Cinema, 1945-51. Bloomsbury Publishing, 2016.

External links
 
 

1946 films
1940s historical drama films
French historical drama films
French black-and-white films
Films directed by Louis Daquin
French films based on plays
Films based on works by Victorien Sardou
Films set in the 16th century
Films set in Flanders
Works about the Eighty Years' War
Cultural depictions of Fernando Álvarez de Toledo, 3rd Duke of Alba
Cultural depictions of William the Silent
1946 drama films
1940s French-language films
Films shot at Epinay Studios
1940s French films